The 2006 FIFA World Cup CONMEBOL–OFC qualification play-off was a two-legged home-and-away tie between the winners of the Oceania qualifying tournament, Australia, and the fifth-placed team from the South American qualifying tournament, Uruguay.

After winning the series, Australia qualified for the 2006 FIFA World Cup held in Germany.

Overview 

The games were played on 12 and 16 November 2005 in Montevideo and Sydney respectively. With the home team winning 1–0 in both matches, the aggregate score was tied 1–1, and, with no away goal advantage, the play-off was decided by a penalty shoot-out, which Australia won 4–2 in order to qualify for the FIFA World Cup for the first time since the 1974 tournament.

It was the second consecutive FIFA World Cup where the two sides had played each other for a place in the tournament. On the first occasion in 2001, Uruguay won 3–1 on aggregate. The draw for determining the order of the home and away legs was made at a FIFA congress on 10 September 2005. Australia finally won a FIFA World Cup play-off after losing to Scotland (1986), Argentina (1994), Iran (1998) and Uruguay (2002).

In the second leg, there was heavy booing by Australian fans during Uruguay's national anthem, in response to the dirty tricks, spitting and punches thrown at the Australian team on their previous playoff meeting.

Venues

Background

Match details

First leg

|}

Second leg

Aftermath
Australia qualified for the 2006 FIFA World Cup Finals in Germany and were drawn into Group F with defending champions Brazil, Croatia and Japan.  After beating Japan 3–1 in their opening match, Australia lost 2–0 to Brazil and in the final match they also drew 2–2 with Croatia, finishing second in the group on four points. In the Round of 16, Australia were defeated 1–0 by the eventual champions, Italy.

For Uruguay it was the third FIFA World Cup out of four since 1990 they failed to qualify. Jorge Fossati lost his job and rehired Óscar Tabárez who managed the team before (1988–1990), and Uruguay entered the Proceso era breaking many records and have qualified for every FIFA World Cup since 2010.

In 2009, Australian Broadcasting Corporation ranked Australia's victory in 2005 as number one on their list of milestone sporting moments of the 2000s. Melbourne paper the Herald Sun named Australia's victory in 2005 as one of 100 great moments in Australian sports history.

A documentary titled November 16 was released in 2015 to commemorate the 10th anniversary of the second leg. It featured interviews with Álvaro Recoba, Fabián Carini and members of the Australian squad.

References

FIFA
Play-off CONMEBOL-OFC
FIFA World Cup qualification inter-confederation play-offs
Australia national soccer team matches
Uruguay national football team matches
qual
2005 in Uruguayan football
3
qual
International association football competitions hosted by Australia
International association football competitions hosted by Uruguay
November 2005 sports events in Australia
November 2005 sports events in South America
2000s in Sydney
2000s in Montevideo
Sports competitions in Sydney
Sports competitions in Montevideo
FIFA World Cup qualification 2006